Marco Giuntelli (16 March 1905 – 15 April 1964) was an Italian racing cyclist. He rode in the 1930 Tour de France.

References

External links
 

1905 births
1964 deaths
Italian male cyclists
Place of birth missing
Sportspeople from the Province of Asti
Cyclists from Piedmont